Little Boxes is a 2016 American dramedy film, directed by Rob Meyer and written by Annie Howell. It stars Melanie Lynskey, Nelsan Ellis, Armani Jackson, Oona Laurence, Janeane Garofalo, and Christine Taylor.

The film had its world premiere at the Tribeca Film Festival on April 15, 2016. It was released on April 14, 2017, by Gunpowder & Sky.

Plot
An interracial family struggles to adjust when they move from Brooklyn, New York to a small town in Washington State.

Cast

 Melanie Lynskey as Gina McNulty-Burns
 Nelsan Ellis as Mack Burns
 Armani Jackson as Clark Burns
 Oona Laurence as Ambrosia Reed
 Janeane Garofalo as Helene Wisdom-Finkelstein
 Christine Taylor as Joan Reed
 Miranda McKeon as Julie Hanson
 Maliq Johnson as William
 Nadia Dajani as Maya
 Veanne Cox as Sarita
 David Charles Ebert as Tom Gibson
 Will Janowitz as Steve
 Julie Hays as Dean Maureen
 Dierdre Friel as Diane Hanson

Production
In May 2015, it was announced Rob Meyer would direct the film from a screenplay by Annie Howell, with Cary Fukunaga executive producing. In August 2015, Melanie Lynskey and Nelsan Ellis were reported to have been cast in the leads.

Release
The film had its world premiere at the Tribeca Film Festival on April 15, 2016. Shortly after, Netflix acquired SVOD rights to the film. Gunpowder & Sky later acquired distribution rights and set the film for an April 14, 2017, release.

Reception
It received a 67% rating on Rotten Tomatoes. Neal Genzlinger of the New York Times said, "Countless movies have examined what happens when a country mouse goes to the city; this one shows that leaving a gentrified urban oasis for a small-town world can be just as jolting."

References

External links
 
 

2016 films
2016 comedy-drama films
American comedy-drama films
American independent films
Films set in Washington (state)
Films shot in New York (state)
Films scored by Kris Bowers
2010s English-language films
Films about interracial romance
2016 independent films
2010s American films